Wild Cat may refer to:

Places
 Wild Cat Bluff, Texas, a ghost town in Texas, USA
Wild Cat Hill, summit in Missouri, USA
Wild Cat Township, Elk County, Kansas, township in Kansas, USA

Music 
 Wild Cat (1927 song), an instrumental duet for violin and guitar
 Wild Cat (Danko Jones album), 2017
 Wild Cat (Tygers of Pan Tang album), 1980

Ships
 Wild Cat (boat), fictional schooner in Arthur Ransome's novels Peter Duck and Missee Lee
 USS Wild Cat (1862), Confederate schooner captured by the Union Navy

Other
 Wild Cat (Seminole) (died 1857), leading chieftain during the Second Seminole War
 Wild Cat Falling, 1965 novel by Australian author Mudrooroo
 The Wild Cat (1921 film), silent German romantic comedy
 Wild Cat (Hersheypark), a wooden roller coaster in Hershey, Pennsylvania, USA
 WildCat (Cedar Point), a steel roller coaster at Cedar Point in Sandusky, Ohio

See also  
 Wildcat (disambiguation)